Addicted to Love is a 1997 American romantic black comedy film directed by Griffin Dunne and starring Meg Ryan, Matthew Broderick, Tchéky Karyo, and Kelly Preston. Its title is based on Robert Palmer's song "Addicted to Love", a cover of which by Neneh Cherry is featured in the film.

Plot
The story begins in a small town, where Sam works as an astronomer and enjoys an idyllic life with his childhood sweetheart Linda, who is a schoolteacher. She wants more experiences than can be offered in their small town, so goes to New York City for a two-month teaching fellowship.

Instead of returning home, Linda sends Sam a Dear John letter announcing that she is staying in New York. He leaves almost immediately for the city, convinced he can get her back.

Sam quickly discovers Linda's living with a new lover, French restaurant owner Anton. Sam breaks into an abandoned building across from Anton's residence, and converts his astronomy equipment to surveillance equipment. He sets up house (and a camera obscura), watching her interactions with Anton in the hopes of finding out more information about them, as well as predicting when they will break up.

Sam's surveillance operation is later discovered by Maggie, a photographer and motorcyclist, determined to get revenge on Anton, her ex-fiancé. She sets up in a nearby room, and soon has sound equipment set up to eavesdrop on the couple.

Out of money and to find out more about him, Sam takes a job at Anton's restaurant as a dishwasher. As the men talk they become friends, Anton unaware of Sam's connection to Linda. Partnering with Maggie in the hopes of driving them apart, a comedy of errors ensues, in which Maggie and Sam try several unethical and nasty tricks to break apart their respective former partners, including: identity theft, assault, embarrassing him in public with a street performer's monkey, paying children to spray him with women's perfume in the street, planting women's underwear and receipts for expensive gifts and getting Anton's restaurant shut down by bringing in cockroaches on a busy night with a food critic there.

Mutually hostile at first, Sam and Maggie eventually warm up to each other in their quest to break up Linda and Anton, complicating their original mission to win their former partners back. When Maggie's nan visits, she insists they kiss for a photo (she believes he is her fiancé), and they obviously share a moment. But suddenly they discover Linda has left Anton. He really had slept with another woman, someone in the bank to help with a loan.

Maggie pushes Sam out, as Linda is now gone, and he runs into a desolate Anton, who talks him into joining him at his place. Maggie watches as they interact. The next day, she's there to spy on Sam when he sees and kisses Linda, and again spies on him that night as he helps a severely injured Anton he unintentionally got put into an upper body cast. Sam mentions Linda, which makes Anton realise something  is fishy about Sam, and he attacks him.

The upshot of it all is, Maggie makes peace with Anton, Sam comes clean with Linda and in the closing there are two couples:  Sam and Maggie, Anton back with Linda.

Cast

Reception

Box office
The film, marking actor Griffin Dunne's full-length directorial debut, was released on May 23, one week before the highly competitive Memorial Day weekend in the United States.

The film opened at No. 2 at the North American box office making US$11.4 million in its opening weekend, behind The Lost World: Jurassic Park.

The film only managed to gross $34,673,095 at the box office, several million less than either Ryan or Broderick's averages.

Critical response
On Rotten Tomatoes, the film has an approval rating of 55% based on reviews from 33 critics. On Metacritic, it has a score of 49 out of 100 based on reviews from 19 critics, indicating "mixed or average reviews". Audiences surveyed by CinemaScore gave the film a grade B on scale of A to F.

Chicago Sun-Times film critic Roger Ebert panned it as immature, implausible and imbecilic, giving it two stars out of a possible four.

The Los Angeles Times' Kevin Thomas called the film "creepy", writing:

Time Out New York film critic Andrew Johnston wrote: "Some say that movies named after hit songs always suck. In its own unspectacular way, Addicted to Love proves them wrong. Griffin Dunne's directorial debut is no artistic triumph, certainly, but it is a reasonably entertaining big-screen sitcom."

In 2020, David Sims, film critic for The Atlantic, called it "underrated" and "a personal favorite".

Locations
While the majority of the filming took place where it was set, in the Greenwich Village area of New York City, some shooting was done in Centreville, Delaware and Swarthmore, Pennsylvania.

References

External links 
 
 

1997 films
1997 romantic comedy films
American romantic comedy films
Films directed by Griffin Dunne
Films scored by Rachel Portman
Films set in New York City
Films with screenplays by Robert Gordon
Miramax films
Warner Bros. films
1997 directorial debut films
1990s American films
Adultery in fiction
American films about revenge